Omphisa anastomosalis, the sweetpotato vineborer, is a moth of the family Crambidae. It is widespread, with records including the Philippines, Indonesia, New Guinea, India, Sri Lanka, Malaysia, Taiwan, Hawaii, Vietnam, China, Japan, Cambodia, Laos, Burma and Thailand.

The wingspan is about 33 mm. Adults have a reddish-brown body and reddish-brown markings on white wings.

The larvae feed on Ipomoea batatas and other Convolvulaceae species. They bore into the main stem and sometimes penetrate the storage roots. The larvae create large tunnels causing hollow cavities in the stem. Infested plants usually have a pile of frass that can be found close to the attacked stem.

Full-grown larvae are 25–30 mm long and pale yellowish white.

The pupa is about 16 mm long and 3 mm wide and nearly cylindrical. It is formed in a slight cocoon in the larval tunnel in the vine. The pupal period lasts 12–16 days.

External links

Sweetpotato stemborer. Sweetpotato DiagNotes. Information on pest status.

Moths described in 1854
Spilomelinae
Moths of Japan